John Brotherton (born August 21, 1980) is an American actor. He is most known for playing Matt Harmon on Netflix's Fuller House, and had roles in films such as Furious 7 (2015) and The Conjuring. He portrayed Jared Banks on the ABC soap opera One Life to Live.

Early life
Brotherton was born in Ellensburg, Washington. He moved with his family to Portland, Oregon, when he was 6 years old and attended elementary school in Portland. The family later moved to the Portland suburb of Beaverton, where Brotherton attended Whitford Junior High School and Beaverton High School, graduating from the latter in 1998. Brotherton attended Oregon State University in Corvallis, Oregon, and was a member of Kappa Sigma fraternity. He began acting at the age of 10.

Career
Since 2016, he has played Matt Harmon, DJ's love interest, on the Netflix series Fuller House, a sequel series to the ABC sitcom Full House. Prior to that Brotherton starred in films such as The Conjuring, Furious 7, and many others. He is also known for playing Jared Banks on the ABC soap opera One Life to Live from August 10, 2007, until November 13, 2009, appearing as a vision on February 9, 2010.

Personal life
Brotherton married his longtime girlfriend Alison on June 7, 2008. They have two daughters.

Filmography

Film

Television

References

External links
 

1980 births
21st-century American male actors
American male film actors
American male soap opera actors
American male television actors
Beaverton High School alumni
Living people
Male actors from Portland, Oregon
Male actors from Washington (state)
Oregon State University alumni
People from Beaverton, Oregon
People from Ellensburg, Washington